Carlos Manuel Vila Nova (born 27 July 1959) is a São Toméan politician who is the fifth and current president of São Tomé and Príncipe, since 2 October 2021. He served as the minister of Public Works and Natural Resources (2010–2012) and minister of Infrastructure, Natural Resources and the Environment (2014–2018) in successive governments of Prime Minister Patrice Trovoada.

He was the Independent Democratic Action candidate for the 2021 presidential election. On 6 September, he was declared president-elect of São Tomé and Príncipe, receiving 58% of the vote and defeating Guilherme Posser da Costa of the MLSTP/PSD. On 14 September, he was declared president by the Tribunal constitutional court.

Biography 
Vila Nova was born in Neves, a city in Lembá District on the northern coast of São Tomé Island.  He received a degree in telecommunications engineering from the University of Oran, Algeria in 1985, then returned to become the head of the computer department of the government Statistics Directorate.  In 1988, he left the civil service to become a sales manager at the Hotel Miramar, which was then the only hotel in the country.  He was promoted to Director of the Hotel Miramar in 1992.  In 1997, he became Director of the hotel Pousada Boa Vista, and also founded his own travel agency Mistral Voyages.  Vila Nova continued in the tourism industry until he entered politics in 2010.

Vila Nova served as Minister of Public Works and Natural Resources in the cabinet of Patrice Trovoada from 2010 until the government lost its majority in 2012.  He was appointed Minister of Infrastructure, Natural Resources and the Environment when Trovoada's Independent Democratic Action (ADI) regained the majority in 2014.  In 2018, Vila Nova was elected to the National Assembly.  He was nominated as the ADI's candidate for the 2021 presidential election.

Vila Nova is married, and has two daughters.

References

1959 births
Living people
Government ministers of São Tomé and Príncipe
Members of the National Assembly (São Tomé and Príncipe)
Independent Democratic Action politicians
21st-century São Tomé and Príncipe politicians
University of Oran alumni
People from Lembá District
Heads of state of São Tomé and Príncipe